James Kimble Vardaman (July 26, 1861 – June 25, 1930) was an American politician from the U.S. state of Mississippi and was the Governor of Mississippi from 1904 to 1908. A Democrat, Vardaman was elected in 1912 to the United States Senate in the first popular vote for office, following the adoption of the 17th Amendment. He defeated Democratic incumbent LeRoy Percy, a member of the planter elite, to be their party's candidate. Vardaman ran unopposed in the general election and served from 1913 to 1919.

Known as "The Great White Chief", Vardaman had gained electoral support for his advocacy of populism and white supremacy, saying: "If it is necessary every Negro in the state will be lynched; it will be done to maintain white supremacy." Aligning with left-wing populists and favoring progressive reforms in railing against banks, railroads, and tariffs, he appealed to the poorer whites, yeomen farmers, and factory workers.

Vardaman's tenure as Governor of Mississippi was marked by his advocacy of regulating corporations, enacting child labor laws, segregating streetcars, ending educational opportunities for African-Americans, and defending lynching.

Early life and education
Vardaman was born in July 1861 in Jackson County, Texas, while it was under the control of the Confederate States of America, a fact he often remembered. He moved to Mississippi, where he studied law and passed the bar. He settled in Greenwood, Mississippi, becoming editor of The Greenwood Commonwealth.

Career

After the Reconstruction era, Mississippi election campaigns were frequently marked by violence and fraud. A biracial coalition of Republicans and Populists briefly controlled the governorship and Mississippi House in the late 1880s.

As a Democrat, Vardaman served in the Mississippi House of Representatives from 1890 to 1896 and was elected as its speaker in 1894. He was known for his populist appeal to the everyday person. State Democrats took action to ensure that they did not lose power again. After having gained control of the legislature by suppressing the black vote, they passed a new constitution in 1890 with provisions, such as a poll tax and literacy test, that raised barriers to voter registration and disenfranchised most blacks.

Referring to the 1890 Mississippi state constitution, Vardaman said:

Vardaman was commissioned as a major in the U.S. Army during the Spanish–American War and served in Puerto Rico.

Vardaman ran twice in Democratic primaries for governor, in 1895 and 1899, but was unsuccessful. The state was virtually one-party, and winning the Democratic primary was tantamount to victory in the general election for any office. In 1903 Vardaman won the primary and the general elections for governor, serving one four-year term (1904–1908). In the election, he said that "a vote for Vardaman is a vote for white supremacy, a vote for the quelling of the arrogant spirit that has been aroused in the blacks by Roosevelt and his henchmen, ...a vote for the safety of the home and the protection of our women and children."

In late December 1906, he went to Scooba, in rural Kemper County, with the Mississippi National Guard, to ensure that control was established. Whites had rioted against blacks there and in Wahalak and feared retaliation; in total, two white men were killed and 13 blacks. The events were covered by the Associated Press and the New York Times, among other newspapers.

By 1910, his political coalition of chiefly poor white farmers and industrial workers began to identify proudly as "rednecks." They began to wear red neckerchiefs to political rallies and picnics.

Vardaman advocated a policy of state-sponsored racism against blacks and said that he supported lynching to maintain white supremacy. From 1877 to 1950, Mississippi had the highest number of lynchings in the nation. He was known as the "Great White Chief."

Vardaman was elected to the U.S. Senate in 1912 in the first popular election of the state's senators by defeating the incumbent LeRoy Percy, a member of the planter elite, in the Democratic primary. He ran on a platform of repealing the Fourteenth and Fifteenth Amendment, which gave blacks the vote and other rights. He was unopposed in the general election. Vardaman served one term, from 1913 until 1919. He was defeated in his primary re-election bid in 1918. The main factor in his defeat was his vote against the U.S. declaration of war on Germany and the entry into World War I. Only five other senators voted with him.

Vardaman ran in the Democratic primary for the U.S. Senate in 1922 but was defeated in the primary runoff by U.S. Representative Hubert Stephens by 9,000 votes.

Rhetoric
Vardaman was known for his provocative speeches and quotes and once called Theodore Roosevelt a "little, mean, coon-flavored miscegenationist." About the education of black children, he remarked, "The only effect of Negro education is to spoil a good field hand and make an insolent cook." "The knowledge of books does not seem to produce any good substantial result with the Negro, but serves to sharpen his cunning, breeds hopes that cannot be fulfilled, creates an inclination to avoid labor, promotes indolence, and in turn leads to crime."

After the president of Tuskegee University, Booker T. Washington, had dined with Roosevelt, Vardaman said that the White House was "so saturated with the odor of the nigger that the rats have taken refuge in the stable."

Regarding Washington's role in politics, Vardaman said: "I am opposed to the nigger's voting, it matters not what his advertised moral and mental qualifications may be. I am just as much opposed to Booker Washington, with all his Anglo-Saxon reenforcement, voting, as I am to voting by the cocoanut-headed, chocolate-colored typical little coon, Andy Dotson, who blacks my shoes every morning. Neither one is fit to perform the supreme functions of citizenship."

Personal life, death, and legacy
Vardaman married Anna Burleson Robinson. Their son, James K. Vardaman, Jr., later was appointed as a governor of the Federal Reserve System, serving from 1946 to 1958.

Vardaman died on June 25, 1930, at the age of 68, at Birmingham Hospital in Birmingham, Alabama.

In July 2017, the University of Mississippi announced that Vardaman's name would be removed from a building that has borne his name since it was built in 1929, but it still has not been removed as of June 2020.

In William Faulkner's novel As I Lay Dying, a character in the Bundren family is named after the governor, presumably because the Bundrens are a family of poor, rural whites, one of Governor Vardaman's key constituencies.

References

Further reading

External links 

 
 

1861 births
1930 deaths
Methodists from Mississippi
Neo-Confederates
Burials in Mississippi
Democratic Party governors of Mississippi
Politicians from Birmingham, Alabama
People of the Spanish–American War
Democratic Party United States senators from Mississippi
Speakers of the Mississippi House of Representatives
Democratic Party members of the Mississippi House of Representatives
People from Yalobusha County, Mississippi
People from Jackson County, Texas
Left-wing populism in the United States
Non-interventionism
History of racism in Mississippi
People born in the Confederate States